The year 1910 in film involved some significant events.

Events
ca. March – Florence Lawrence becomes America's first publicly named motion picture actress; she is generally regarded as the first true movie star.
March 18 – The first cinematic version of Mary Shelley's Frankenstein (1818) is released in the United States by Edison Studios. One of the first horror films, it features (unbilled) actor Charles Ogle as the monster.
May 6 – Newsreel footage of the funeral of Edward VII in London is shot in Kinemacolor, making it the first color newsreel.
July – The Johnson-Jeffries Fight footage causes race riots and is banned in the South of the US.
August 2 – A Danish melodrama, The White Slave Trade (Den Hvide Slavehandel), marks the first time film is used to study prostitution.
August – Kalem Studios director Sidney Olcott becomes the first American to make a motion picture outside of the United States, The Lad from Old Ireland (released November 23).
Pathé News is formed in London, producing newsreels and documentaries in the UK until 1970.
Marcus Loew partners with Adolph Zukor, Joseph Schenck and Nicholas Schenck renaming his theatre chain Loew's Consolidated Enterprises.

Films released in 1910
 Abraham Lincoln's Clemency
 The Abyss (Afgrunden), starring Asta Nielsen
 Aeroplane Flight And Wreck
 Alice's Adventures in Wonderland
 Der Alpenjager
 Am Abend, one of the earliest works of hardcore pornography
 The American Suicide Club (French-U.S. co-production/ Lux)
 Another's Ghost (French/ Pathe) starring Mevisto, Henri Etievant, Henry Krauss
 As It Is In Life, directed by D. W. Griffith, starring Mary Pickford
 Back to Life After 2,000 Years (aka The Roman's Awakening) (French/ Pathe)
 Bebe (series)
 The Beechwood Ghost (Powers Films, which years later merged with Universal Pictures) 
 The Bewitched Messenger (British/ Bat-Brockliss)
 The Blue Bird
 Bride of the Haunted Castle (French film/ Artistic-Pathe) theatrically released in England and U.S.
 The Buddha's Curse (French/ Lux)
 Cagliostro (French film) directed by Camille de Morlhon and Gaston Velle, starring Helene du Montel, Jean Jacquinet, Stacia Napierkowska 
 The Castle Ghost (French/ Pathe)
 The Cat That was Changed into a Woman (French/Pathe) directed by Michel Carre; this was the 2nd French film that adapted from the Aesop fable "Venus and the Cat" (see also 1909)
 Chibusa no enoki (Japanese) starred Matsunosuke Onoe 
 The Children of Edward the Fourth (French/ Pathe-Film d'Art) directed by Henri Andreani, starring Rene Alexandre, Albert Bras, Jeanne Delvair 
 A Christmas Carol (Edison)
 Countess Ankarstrom (German film/ Deutsche Bioscope) directed by Gebhard Schatzler-Perasini, starring Paul Bildt
 The Curse of the Wandering Minstrel (aka The Singer's Curse) German/ Messter, based on a ballad written by Ludwig Uhland 
 A Day in the Life of a Coal Miner, produced by Charles Urban
 Death (Danish/Regia Kunstfilms) directed by Holger Holm, starring Emilie Sannom and Robert Schmidt
 The Defeat of Satan (French/ Pathe) directed by Georges Denola, starring Madeleine Celiat, Georges Laumonier and Jacques Vandenne 
 The Demon of Dunkirque (Italian/British co-production) early example of international financing
 The Detachable Man (Pathe)
 The Devil's Mother-in-Law (French/ Pathe)
 Dr. Jekyll and Mr. Hyde (Denmark/ Nordisk) written and directed by August Blom, starring Alwin Neuss as Jekyll/Hyde, Viggo Larsen and Oda Alstrup;  film is lost today
 Dr. Mesner's Fatal Prescription (British/ Warwick Productions) 
 The Dream of Old Scrooge (based on the Charles Dickens novel "A Christmas Carol")
 The Duality of Man (British/ Wrench Films) adapted The Strange Case of Dr. Jekyll and Mr. Hyde by Robert Louis Stevenson; some sources credit Harry Brodribb Irving with directing this lost film
 The Electric Vitalizer (British/ Kineto)
 The Enchanted Wreath (British/ Warwick) 
 The Fairy Bookseller (Pathe)
 The Family Doctor
 Faust (Italy/ Cines) directed by Enrico Guazzoni, starring Fernanda Negri-Pouget, Ugo Bazzini, Alfredo Bracci; only existing print is missing a scene
 Faust (French) produced by Eclair Films
 Faust (French/ Pathe) directed by Henri Andreani for Pathe Films
 The Fiendish Tenant (Gaumont)
 The Forbidden Fruit (French/ Pathe) written & directed by Gaston Velle 
 Frankenstein, directed by J. Searle Dawley for Edison, starred Charles Ogle, Augustus Phillips and Mary Fuller
 The Freak of Ferndale Forest (British/ Warwick Productions)
 The Fugitive, directed by D. W. Griffith
 Funeral Of Edward VII
 The Ghost in the Oven, produced by William Selig
 The Ghost of Mudtown (French/ Pathe)
 The Golden Beetle (French/British co-production/ Continental-Warwick) directed by (and starring) Henri Desfontaines, based on The Gold Bug, a story by Edgar Allan Poe
 The Golden Supper (Biograph) features a premature burial
 Haunted by Conscience (Kalem Films)
 Hop-Frog, aka The Jester (French/British co-production/ Continental-Warwick) directed by Henri Desfontaines, starring Colanna Romano, based on the 1849 short story by Edgar Allan Poe (a lost film today)
 The House of the Seven Gables, directed by J. Searle Dawley for Edison, starring Mary Fuller as Hepzibah Pyncheon, based on the 1851 Nathaniel Hawthorne novel
 The House with Closed Shutters, directed by D. W. Griffith
 Hugo, the Hunchback, directed by William Selig, based on the Victor Hugo novel Notre Dame de Paris
 Den Hvide Slavehandel (translation: The White Slave Trade), directed by August Blom
 Inferno (Italian/ Helios Films), based on the novel by Dante; it was followed by a sequel Purgatory in 1912.
 In Old California, directed by D. W. Griffith.  First Hollywood film in cinema.
 In the Border States, directed by D. W. Griffith
 Jane Eyre, (Thanhouser) written and directed by Theodore Marston for producer Edwin Thanhouser; starring Marie Eline, Gloria Gallop and Frank Hall Crane
 Jane Eyre (The Mad Lady of Chester), directed by Mario Caserini (Italian/ Cines)
 A Japanese Peach Boy, produced by Thomas Edison
 The Jealous Professors (Lux Film)
 The Johnson-Jeffries Fight
 The Key of Life, produced by Thomas Edison Co.
 King Philip the Fair and the Templars (French/ Eclair Film) directed by Victorin-Hyppolyte Jasset, starring Georges Saillard and Raoul d'Auchy; first film to deal with the topic of the Knights Templar
 A Lad from Old Ireland, directed by Sidney Olcott
 The Legend of the Undines (French film/ Pathe) based on the 1814 opera by E. T. A. Hoffman (an "undine" is a female water sprite)
 Little Snow White (French/ Pathe)
 The Lobster Nightmare (British)
 The Love of a Hunchback (British/ Empire Film) based on Victor Hugo's novel Notre Dame de Paris
 Lucrezia Borgia (Italian film/ Cines) directed by Mario Caserini, starring Francesca Bertini and Maria Gasperini
 Lured by a Phantom, aka The King of Thule (French) directed by Etienne Arnaud and Louis Feuillade, based on a poem written by Goethe 
 Making Christmas Crackers
 Max Hypnotized (French/ Pathe) directed by Lucien Nonguet, starring Max Linder
 The Minotaur (aka Theseus and the Minotaur), written and directed by J. Stuart Blackton for Vitagraph 
 Museum Spooks, or Dreams in a Picture Gallery (British)
 The Mystery of Temple Court (Vitagraph)
 Necklace of the Dead (Denmark/ Nordisk) directed by August Blom, starring Ingeborg Middleboe Larsen, Thorkild Roose and Nicolai Neiiendam; said to be based on Edgar Allan Poe's short story The Oblong Box
 New York of Today, produced by Edison Studios
 Oh, You Skeleton (Selig Polyscope)
 The Phantom (French/ Pathe-Le Film Russe) aka Le Fantome
The Picture of Dorian Gray (1910 film) (Denmark/ Regia Kunstfilms) directed by Alex Strom, starring Valdemar Psilander, Adam Poulsen; 1st film adaptation of the Oscar Wilde novel
 Queen of Spades, aka Pikovaya dama (Russian film) directed by Pyotr Chardynin, based on the novel by Alexander Pushkin
 Queen of Spades (German film/ Deutsche Bioscop) produced by Deutsche Bioscop, also based on the novel by Alexander Pushkin
 Ramona, directed by D. W. Griffith, starring Mary Pickford
 The Red Inn, aka L'Auberge Rouge (French/ Pathe) directed by Camille de Morlhon, written by Abel Gance, starring Jeanne Cheirel, Julien Clement, Jean Worms, and Abel Gance, based on the novel by Honore de Balzac
 Robert, the Devil: or, Freed from Satan's Power (French/ Gaumont) directed by Etienne Arnaud, starring Leonce Perret and Maurice Vinot; based on a 1831 libretto written by Eugene Scribe and Casimir Delavigne
 The Romance of the Mummy (French/ Pathe) based on the Theophile Gautier book
 Rose O'Salem Town, directed by D. W. Griffith for American Mutoscope and Biograph, starring Dorothy West, Clara T. Bracy and Henry B. Walthall, set against the backdrop of the Salem Witch Trials
 St. George and the Dragon (Edison Co.)
 Satan's Rival (aka A Rival to Satan)(French) directed by Gerard Bourgeois
 Secret of the Hand (French/ Lux) dealt with the subject of the Chinese Tong
 The Skeleton (Vitagraph)
 Slippery Jim, directed by Ferdinand Zecca
 The Snake Man (French/ Lux)
 Sorceress of the Strand (French/ Eclair) directed by Victorin-Hippolyte Jasset, starring Eugenie Nau, Emile Keppens, and Marie Barthe
 The Spectre (French/ Pathe)
 The Spirit of the Sword (French/ Pathe)
 A Spiritualistic Seance (French/ Gaumont)
 Teddy Roosevelt Returns From Africa
 Testing a Soldier's Courage (French/ Gaumont)
 Thunderbolt
 A Trip to Davy Jones' Locker (French/ Pathe); a special effects film influenced by the work of George Melies
 A Trip to Mars (Edison Co.)
 Twelfth Night
 The Unchanging Sea, directed by D. W. Griffith
 Vengeance of the Dead (French/ Pathe); influenced by the Oscar Wilde novel "The Portrait of Dorian Gray Le Vitrail Diabolique, directed by Georges Melies
 Im Wannseebad Wanted – A Mummy (British/ Cricks & Martin) directed by A. E. Coleby
 Wedded Beneath the Waves (French/ Gaumont)
 What the Daisy Said, starring Mary Pickford
 White Fawn's Devotion, directed by James Young Deer the first Native American Director
 Wilful Peggy, directed by D. W. Griffith, starring Mary Pickford
 The Witch of the Glen (British/ Warwick Productions)
 The Witch of the Ruins (French/ Pathe)
 The Witches' Spell (British/ Urban Films) produced by Charles Urban
 The Wonderful Wizard of Oz''

Births

Deaths

Debuts
 Leah Baird – Jean and the Waif
 Carlyle Blackwell – Uncle Tom's Cabin (short)
 Eleanor Caines – The New Boss of Bar X Ranch (short)
 Grace Cunard – The Duke's Plan (short)
 Margarita Fischer – There, Little Girl, Don't Cry (short)
 Helen Gardner – How She Won Him (short)
 Hoot Gibson – Pride of the Range
 Alice Joyce – The Deacon's Daughter (short)
 J. Warren Kerrigan – A Voice from the Fireplace (short)
 Mae Marsh – Ramona (short)
 Asta Nielsen – The Woman Always Pays (short)
 Mabel Normand – Indiscretions of Betty
 Wallace Reid – The Phoenix (short)
 Marin Sais – Twelfth Night (short)
 Norma Talmadge – The Household Pest
 Pearl White – The Missing Bridegroom (short)

References

External links

 
Film by year